Slaheddine Ben Mbarek (27 July 1920, in Béja – 22 July 2014) was a Tunisian minister, diplomat and the president of his hometown soccer team Olympique Béja from 1984 until 1985. He was the Ambassador of Tunisia to Belgium as well as Minister of Economy and Commerce from 1977 until 1980.

References

1936 births
2014 deaths
People from Béja
Democratic Constitutional Rally politicians
Socialist Destourian Party politicians
Tunisian Sunni Muslims
Ambassadors of Tunisia to Belgium
Government ministers of Tunisia